Ferenc Deák may refer to:

 Ferenc Deák (footballer) (1922–1998), Hungarian footballer
 Ferenc Deák (politician) (1803–1876), Hungarian statesman and Minister of Justice